Mululiao is a railway station on the Forestry Bureau Alishan Forest Railway line located in Zhuqi Township, Chiayi County, Taiwan.

History
The station was opened on 1 October 1912. In 1981, the station was downgraded into an unattended station and the original wooden building was demolished.

Architecture
The station is located at 324 meters above sea level.

See also
 List of railway stations in Taiwan

References

1912 establishments in Taiwan
Alishan Forest Railway stations
Railway stations in Chiayi County
Railway stations opened in 1912